The Pitheciidae are one of the five families of New World monkeys now recognised. Formerly, they were included in the family Atelidae. The family includes the titis, saki monkeys and uakaris. Most species are native to the Amazon region of Brazil, with some being found from Colombia in the north to Bolivia in the south.

Characteristics
Pitheciids are small to medium-sized monkeys, ranging from 23 cm in head-body length for the smaller titis, to 44–49 cm for the uakaris. They have medium to long fur, in a wide range of colors, often with contrasting patches, especially on the face.

They are diurnal and arboreal animals, found in tropical forests from low-lying swamp to mountain slopes. They are predominantly herbivorous, eating mostly fruit and seeds, although some species will also eat a small number of insects. Sakis and uakaris have a diastema between the canine and premolar teeth, but the titis, which have unusually small canines for New World monkeys, do not. All species have the dental formula: 

Females give birth to a single young after a gestation period of between four and six months, depending on species. The uakaris and bearded sakis are polygamous, living in groups of 8-30 individuals. Each group has multiple males, which establish a dominance hierarchy amongst themselves. The titis and Pithecia sakis, by contrast, are monogamous and live in much smaller family groups.

Classification
There are 54 currently recognized extant species of pitheciid monkey, grouped into two subfamilies and six genera. Eleven extinct genera known from the fossil record are placed in the family, extending the age of the family to the Miocene.

 Family Pitheciidae: titis, sakis and uakaris
 Subfamily Callicebinae, titis
 Genus Plecturocebus
 White-eared titi, Plecturocebus donacophilus
 Rio Beni titi, Plecturocebus modestus
 Rio Mayo titi, Plecturocebus oenanthe
 Ollala brothers's titi, Plecturocebus olallae
 White-coated titi, Plecturocebus pallescens
Urubamba brown titi, Plecturocebus urubambensis
 Baptista Lake titi, Plecturocebus baptista
 Prince Bernhard's titi, Plecturocebus bernhardi
 Brown titi, Plecturocebus brunneus
Parecis titi, Plecturocebus parecis
 Ashy black titi, Plecturocebus cinerascens
 Hoffmanns's titi, Plecturocebus hoffmannsi
 Red-bellied titi, Plecturocebus moloch
 Vieira's titi, Plecturocebus vieirai
 Milton's titi, Plecturocebus miltoni
 Chestnut-bellied titi, Plecturocebus caligatus
 Coppery titi, Plecturocebus cupreus
 Toppin's titi, Plecturocebus toppini
 Madidi titi, Plecturocebus aureipalatii
 Caquetá titi, Plecturocebus caquetensis
 White-tailed titi, Plecturocebus discolor
 Hershkovitz's titi, Plecturocebus dubius
 Ornate titi, Plecturocebus ornatus
 Stephen Nash's titi, Plecturocebus stephennashi
 Alta Floresta titi, Plecturocebus grovesi
 Genus Callicebus
 Barbara Brown's titi, Callicebus barbarabrownae
 Coimbra Filho's titi, Callicebus coimbrai
 Coastal black-handed titi, Callicebus melanochir
 Black-fronted titi, Callicebus nigrifrons
 Atlantic titi, Callicebus personatus
Genus †Miocallicebus
†Miocallicebus villaviejai
 Genus Cheracebus
 Lucifer titi, Cheracebus lucifer
 Black titi, Cheracebus lugens
 Colombian black-handed titi, Cheracebus medemi
 Red-headed titi, Cheracebus regulus
 Collared titi, Cheracebus torquatus
Genus †Carlocebus
†Carlocebus carmenensis
†Carlocebus intermedius
Genus †Homunculus
†Homunculus patagonicus
 Subfamily Pitheciinae
 Genus Cacajao, uakaris
 Black-headed uakari, Cacajao melanocephalus
 Bald uakari, Cacajao calvus
 Aracá uakari, Cacajao ayresii
 Neblina uakari, Cacajao hosomi
Genus †Cebupithecia
†Cebupithecia sarmientoi
 Genus Chiropotes, bearded sakis
 Black bearded saki, Chiropotes satanas
 Red-backed bearded saki, Chiropotes chiropotes
 Brown-backed bearded saki, Chiropotes israelita
 Uta Hick's bearded saki, Chiropotes utahickae
 White-nosed saki, Chiropotes albinasus
Genus †Nuciruptor
†Nuciruptor rubricae
Genus †Mazzonicebus
†Mazzonicebus almendrae]]
 Genus Pithecia, sakis
 Equatorial saki, Pithecia aequatorialis 
 White-footed saki or buffy saki, Pithecia albicans 
 Cazuza's saki, Pithecia cazuzai 
 Golden-faced saki, Pithecia chrysocephala 
 Hairy saki, Pithecia hirsuta 
 Burnished saki, Pithecia inusta 
 Rio Tapajós saki or Gray's bald-faced saki, Pithecia irrorata
 Isabel's saki, Pithecia isabela 
 Monk saki, Pithecia monachus 
 Miller's saki, Pithecia milleri
 Mittermeier's Tapajós saki, Pithecia mittermeieri (disputed)
 Napo saki, Pithecia napensis
Pissinatti's saki, Pithecia pissinattii (disputed)
 White-faced saki, Pithecia pithecia 
 Rylands' bald-faced saki, Pithecia rylandsi (disputed)
 Vanzolini's bald-faced saki, Pithecia vanzolinii 
Genus †Proteropithecia
†Proteropithecia neuquenensis
Genus †Soriacebus
†Soriacebus ameghinorum
†Soriacebus adrianae
†Genus Xenothrix
†Jamaican monkey, Xenothrix mcgregori
†Genus Antillothrix
†Hispaniolan monkey, Antillothrix bernensis
†Genus Insulacebus
†Insulacebus toussentiana

*Newly described species.
†Extinct taxa.

Silvestro etal 2017 showed the relationship among the extinct and extant pitheciid genera:

References

External links 

New monkeys in Brazil

 
New World monkeys
Extant Miocene first appearances
Primate families
Taxa named by St. George Jackson Mivart
Taxa described in 1865